Tis Castle is a historical castle located in Chabahar County in Sistan and Baluchestan Province, The longevity of this fortress dates back to the Safavid dynasty.

References 

Castles in Iran